Kerthney Carty (born 4 February 1962) is an English professional football manager.

Career
Since January until March 2008 he coached the Anguilla national football team.

References

External links
Profile at Soccerway.com

1962 births
Living people
English football managers
Expatriate football managers in Anguilla
Anguilla national football team managers
Place of birth missing (living people)
English expatriate football managers
English expatriate sportspeople in Anguilla